Espargo is a former civil parish in the municipality of Santa Maria da Feira, Portugal. In 2013, the parish merged into the new parish Santa Maria da Feira, Travanca, Sanfins e Espargo. It has a population of 1,309 inhabitants and a total area of 5.70 km2.

Attractions

In the parish is located one of the largest and most modern congress centres in the country, the Europarque, and a science centre, the Visionarium.

References

External links
 Europarque - official website that is available in English, Portuguese and Spanish
 Visionarium - Official Website

Former parishes of Santa Maria da Feira